The Dedham Village Historic District is a historic district encompassing the historic center of Dedham, Massachusetts.  Its principal focus is a stretch of High Street between Bridge and Ames Streets; it extends south along Bridge Street to Haven Street, as well as along Ames and Court Streets, and small streets adjacent.  The area has been associated with the growth and development of Dedham since the community was established in 1636.  Its most notable structure is the Norfolk County Courthouse, a National Historic Landmark.  It also includes the Old Village Cemetery. The district was listed on the National Register of Historic Places in 2006. It is roughly bounded by Village Avenue and High, Court, Washington, School, and Chestnut Streets.

See also
Fairbanks House (Dedham, Massachusetts)
Samuel Dexter House
Daniel Slattery house
National Register of Historic Places listings in Norfolk County, Massachusetts

References

Historic districts in Norfolk County, Massachusetts
Dedham, Massachusetts
National Register of Historic Places in Norfolk County, Massachusetts
Historic districts on the National Register of Historic Places in Massachusetts